is a Japanese video game released in 1987 for the NEC PC-8801 and NEC PC-9801. The game was also ported to Sharp X68000, MSX, the SNES and TurboGrafx-CD.

Summary
This video game is a mixture of the role-playing video game and survival horror genres and set in the vicinity of Boston, Massachusetts in a town called "Newcam", it is modeled after the fictional city Arkham created by H. P. Lovecraft.

The horror part of the game lies in the exploration of the fictional Weathertop Mansion, whose owner dabbled in black magic. The game's CRPG features include its character classes—Dilettante, Medium, Detective, Scientist, and Journalist—and that the player can leave the mansion to walk around the town to go to shops to buy items needed to defeat the monsters and complete the game.

Reception
On release, Famicom Tsūshin scored the Super Famicom version of the game a 26 out of 40.

References

External links
 

1987 video games
1980s horror video games
Human Entertainment games
NEC PC-8801 games
NEC PC-9801 games
MSX2 games
X68000 games
Single-player video games
Super Nintendo Entertainment System games
Role-playing video games
TurboGrafx-CD games
Vic Tokai games
Video games developed in Japan
Video games featuring protagonists of selectable gender
Video games set in 1924
Video games set in Massachusetts